Hartford is a suburb of Huntingdon and former civil parish, now in the parish of Huntingdon, in Cambridgeshire, England. Historically part of Huntingdonshire, it is not far west of Wyton. It lies on the A141 road and on the north bank of the River Great Ouse, upon which it has a significant marina. In 1931 the parish had a population of 464. On 1 April 1935 the parish was abolished and merged with Huntingdon, part also went to Houghton and Wyton and Kings Ripton.

It is sometimes known as Hartford-cum-Sapley, and in the past has been known as Hereford by Huntingdon, Herford, Hertford and Harford.

All Saints' Church in Hartford is a Church of England parish church, built in 1180 on the north riverbank. It is a Grade II* listed building. The church has six bells.

History

Medieval Hartford
Despite the rival claim of Hertford, there is a case for identifying Hartford as the venue of the 672 Council of Hertford, the first general council of the Anglo-Saxon Church.

In 1085 William the Conqueror ordered that a survey should be carried out across England to discover who owned which parts and what it was worth. The survey took place in 1086 and the results were recorded in what, since the 12th century, has become known as the Domesday Book. Starting with the king himself, for each landholder within a county there is a list of their estates or manors; and, for each manor, there is a summary of the resources of the manor, the amount of annual rent that was collected by the lord of the manor both in 1066 and in 1086, together with the taxable value.

Hartford was listed in the Domesday Book in the Hundred of Hurstingstone in Huntingdonshire; the name of the settlement was written as Hereforde in the Domesday Book. In 1086 there was just one manor at Hartford; the annual rent paid to the lord of the manor in 1066 had been £24 and the rent had fallen to £15 in 1086.

The Domesday Book records that there were 34 households at Hartford. There is no consensus about the average size of a household at that time; estimates range from 3.5 to 5.0 people per household. Using these figures then an estimate of the population of Hartford in 1086 is that it was within the range of 119 and 170 people.

The Domesday Book uses a number of units of measure for areas of land that are now unfamiliar terms, such as hides and ploughlands. By 1086, the hide had become a unit of tax assessment rather than an actual land area; a hide was the amount of land that could be assessed as £1 for tax purposes. The survey records that there were twelve ploughlands at Hartford in 1086 and that there was the capacity for a further five ploughlands.

The tax assessment in the Domesday Book was known as geld or danegeld and was a type of land-tax based on the hide or ploughland. It was originally a way of collecting a tribute to pay off the Danes when they attacked England, and was only levied when necessary. Following the Norman Conquest, the geld was used to raise money for the King and to pay for continental wars; by 1130, the geld was being collected annually. Having determined the value of a manor's land and other assets, a tax of so many shillings and pence per pound of value would be levied on the land holder. While this was typically two shillings in the pound the amount did vary; for example, in 1084 it was as high as six shillings in the pound. For the manor at Hartford the total tax assessed was 15 geld.

By 1086 there were two churches and a priest at Hartford.

The manor of Hartford remained in the possession of Huntingdon Priory until the dissolution of the monasteries in 1536.

Modern history
On 3 May 1977, Shortly after 1100 hrs, Royal Air Force, English Electric Canberra PR.9 aircraft, XH137, of No. 39 Squadron was returning to its base at RAF Wyton, near Huntingdon, after a routine training flight. About two miles from the end of the runway, it crashed by some houses in the estate of Oxmoor in the village of Hartford, north-east of Huntingdon. Three young children were killed and five people were injured, of whom two are detained in hospital. The two RAF members of the crew were also killed, said Secretary of State for Defence, Mr. Frederick Mulley.

Demography

Population
In the period 1801 to 1901 the population of Hartford was recorded every ten years by the UK census.  During this time the population was in the range of 283 (the lowest was in 1811) and 452 (the highest was in 1831).

From 1901, a census was taken every ten years with the exception of 1941 (due to the Second World War).

All population census figures from report Historic Census figures Cambridgeshire to 2011 by Cambridgeshire Insight.

References

External links

 Hartford Conservation Group
 Hartford Marina, official site
 Hartford Marina, information from British Waterways.
 Town names
 Anglican churches around Huntingdon
 About bell-ringing
 Recording of Hartford church bells in MP3 format, by local sound engineer Mark Tinley
 Binaural recording of a Hartford garden with church bells in MP3 format, by Mark Tinley. Quiet listening using headphones recommended (you can hear the birds flying over your head).

Populated places in Cambridgeshire
Populated places on the River Great Ouse
Former civil parishes in Cambridgeshire
Aviation accidents and incidents locations in England
Huntingdon